Abdal Hakim Murad (born: Timothy John Winter; 15 May 1960) is an English academic, theologian and Islamic scholar who is a proponent of Islamic neo-traditionalism. His work includes publications on Islamic theology, modernity, and Anglo-Muslim relations, and he has translated several Islamic texts.

He is the Founder and Dean of the Cambridge Muslim College, Aziz Foundation Professor of Islamic Studies at both Cambridge Muslim College and Ebrahim College, Director of Studies (Theology and Religious Studies) at Wolfson College and the Shaykh Zayed Lecturer of Islamic Studies in the Faculty of Divinity at University of Cambridge.

Background and education
Murad is the son of an architect and an artist. He became Muslim in 1979. He was educated at Westminster School and graduated with a double-first in Arabic from Pembroke College, Cambridge in 1983. He then went on to study at Al Azhar University in Cairo and further private study with individual scholars in Saudi Arabia and Yemen. After returning to England, he studied Turkish and Persian at the University of London.

Major work and projects
In 2009 Murad helped to open the Cambridge Muslim College, an institute designed to train British imams. Murad also directs the Anglo-Muslim Fellowship for Eastern Europe, and the Sunna Project which has published the foremost scholarly Arabic editions of the major Sunni Hadith collections. He serves as the secretary of the Muslim Academic Trust. Murad is active in translating key Islamic texts into English including a translation of two volumes of the Islamic scholar al-Ghazali's Ihya Ulum al-Din. His academic publications include many articles on Islamic theology and Muslim-Christian relations as well as two books in Turkish on political theology. His book reviews sometimes appear in the Times Literary Supplement. He is also the editor of the Cambridge Companion to Classical Islamic Theology (2008) and author of Bombing without Moonlight, which in 2007 was awarded the King Abdullah I Prize for Islamic Thought. Murad is also a contributor to BBC Radio 4's Thought for the Day. Additionally, Murad is one of the signatories of A Common Word Between Us and You, an open letter by Islamic scholars to Christian leaders, calling for peace and understanding.

Cambridge Mosque Project
Murad is the founder and leader of the Cambridge Central Mosque project which has developed a new purpose built mosque in Cambridge to cater for up to 1,000 worshipers. The mosque is an "Eco mosque" with substantial reliance on green energy and an almost-zero carbon footprint. Regarding the project, Murad stated, "This will be a very substantial world class landmark building in what is considered by some to be a down-at-heel part of Cambridge."

Political views

Views on Islamophobia

Murad has criticized the term "Islamophobia" for its implication that hostility to Islam and Muslims is based on race or tribalistic fear rather than enmity against their religion itself. Nonetheless, he has decried the rising hostility to Islam in Europe, and suggested that it is fueled by the loss of faith and tradition within Europe itself, which he says results in Europeans formulating their identity by contrasting themselves with a Muslim Other.

Views on extremism
Murad is a traditionalist and considers the views of extremists like al-Qaeda as religiously illegitimate and inauthentic. He decries the failure of extremists to adhere to the classical canons of Islamic law and theology and denounces their fatwas. He unequivocally rejects suicide bombing and considers the killing of noncombatants as always forbidden, noting that some sources consider it worse than murder. According to Murad, Osama bin Laden and his right-hand man Ayman al-Zawahiri were un-Islamic, unqualified vigilantes who violate basic Islamic teachings.

Murad is critical of Western foreign policy for fueling anger and resentment in the Muslim world. He is equally critical of Saudi Arabia's Wahhabi ideology, which he believes gives extremists a theological pretext for their extremism and violence.

Personal life
Murad's younger brother is football writer Henry Winter.

Awards and nominations
In 2003, he was awarded the Pilkington Teaching Prize by Cambridge University and in 2007 he was awarded the King Abdullah I Prize for Islamic Thought for his short booklet Bombing Without Moonlight. He has consistently been included in The 500 Most Influential Muslims list published annually by the Royal Aal al-Bayt Institute for Islamic Thought and was ranked in 2012 as the 50th most influential. In January 2015, Winter was nominated for the Services to Education award at the British Muslim Awards. Most recently in the 2022 Edition of The 500 Most Influential Muslims, Winter was ranked the 45th most influential Muslim in the world.

Publications

Books written
Travelling Home: Essays on Islam in Europe (Cambridge: The Quilliam Press, 2020) 
Gleams from the Rawdat al-Shuhada: (Garden of the Martyrs) of Husayn Vaiz Kashifi (Cambridge: Muslim Academic Trust, 2015)
Montmorency's Book of Rhymes Illustrated by Anne Yvonne Gilbert (California: Kinza Press, 2013)
Commentary on the Eleventh Contentions (Cambridge: Quilliam Press Ltd, 2012)
XXI Asrda Islom: Postmodern Dunyoda qiblani topish (Tashkent: Sharq nashriyoti, 2005)
Muslim Songs of the British Isles: Arranged for Schools (London: Quilliam Press Ltd, 2005)
Postmodern Dünya’da kibleyi bulmak (Istanbul: Gelenek, 2003)
Co-authored with John A. Williams, Understanding Islam and the Muslims (Louisville: Fons Vitae, 2002)
Understanding the Four Madhhabs: Facts About Ijtihad and Taqlid (Cambridge: Muslim Academic Trust, 1999)

Books edited
The Cambridge Companion to Classical Islamic Theology (Cambridge: Cambridge University Press, 2008) 
Islam, Religion of Life by Abdul Wadod Shalabi (USA: Starlatch Press, 2006) 
Co-edited with Richard Harries and Norman Solomon, Abraham’s Children: Jews, Christians and Muslims in Conversation (Edinburgh: T&T Clark/Continuum, 2006)

Translations
Imam al-Busiri, The Mantle Adorned (London: Quilliam Press, 2009)
Al-Asqalani Ibn Hajar, Selections from Fath Al-Bari (Cambridge: Muslim Academic Trust, 2000)
Abu Hamid al-Ghazali, Disciplining the Soul and Breaking the Two Desires (Cambridge: Islamic Texts Society, 1995)
Roger Du Pasquier, Unveiling Islam (Cambridge: Islamic Texts Society, 1992)
Imam al-Bayhaqi, Seventy-Seven Branches of Faith (London: Quilliam Press, 1990)
Abu Hamid al-Ghazali, The Remembrance of Death and the Afterlife (Cambridge: Islamic Texts Society, 1989)

Articles
“America as a Jihad State: Middle Eastern Perceptions of Modern American Theopolitics.” Muslim World 101 (2011): 394–411.
"Opinion: Bin Laden's sea burial was 'sad miscalculation" CNN.com (9 May 2011).
“Jesus and Muhammad: New Convergences.” Muslim World 99/1 (2009): 21–38.
“Poverty and the Charism of Ishmael.” In Building a Better Bridge: Muslims, Christians, and the Common Good, edited by Michael Ipgrave (Washington, DC: Georgetown University Press, 2009).
"Ibn Kemal (d. 940/1534) on Ibn 'Arabi's Hagiology." In Sufism and Theology, edited by Ayman Shihadeh (Edinburgh: Edinburgh University Press, 2007).
"The Saint with Seven Tombs." In The Inner Journey: Views from the Islamic Tradition, edited by William Chittick (Ashgate: White Cloud Press, 2007).
"Ishmael and the Enlightenment's Crise de Coeur." In Scripture, Reason, and the Contemporary Islam-West Encounter, edited by Basit Bilal Koshul and Steven Kepnes (New York: Palgrave, 2007).
"Qur'anic Reasoning as an Academic Practice." Modern Theology 22/3 (2006): 449–463; reprinted in The Promise of Scriptural Reasoning, edited by David Ford and C. C. Pecknold (Malden: Blackwell, 2006).
“The Chador of God on Earth: the Metaphysics of the Muslim Veil.” New Blackfriars 85 (2004): 144–157.
“Bombing Without Moonlight: the Origins of Suicidal Terrorism.” Encounters 10:1–2 (2004): 93–126.
"The Poverty of Fanaticism." In Fundamentalism, and the Betrayal of Tradition, edited by Joseph Lumbard (Bloomington: World Wisdom, 2004).
“Readings of the ‘Reading’.” In Scriptures in Dialogue: Christians and Muslims Studying the Bible and the Qur'an Together, edited by Michael Ipgrace (London: Church House Publishing, 2004), 50–55.
“Tradition or Extradition? The threat to Muslim-Americans.” In The Empire and the Crescent: Global Implications for a New American Century, edited by Aftab Ahmad Malik (Bristol: Amal Press, 2003).
"Muslim Loyalty and Belonging: Some Reflections on the Psychosocial Background." In British Muslims: Loyalty and Belonging, edited by Mohammad Siddique Seddon, Dilwar Hussain, and Nadeem Malik (Leicester: Islamic Foundation; London: Citizens Organising Foundation, 2003).
“Pulchra ut luna: some Reflections on the Marian Theme in Muslim-Catholic Dialogue.” Journal of Ecumenical Studies 36/3 (1999): 439–469.
“The Last Trump Card: Islam and the Supersession of Other Faiths.” Studies in Interreligious Dialogue 9/2 (1999): 133–155.
“Scorning the Prophet goes beyond free speech – it’s an act of violence” Daily Telegraph (17 Jan 2015).

References

External links 
Lectures by Abdal Hakim Murad
Abdal Hakim Murad audio and video lectures
Sunna Project.
A blog of podcasts of Murad's Friday sermons

1960 births
Living people
English Sufis
Scholars of Sufism
Converts to Sunni Islam
English Sunni Muslim scholars of Islam
21st-century Muslim scholars of Islam
People educated at Westminster School, London
Alumni of Pembroke College, Cambridge
Al-Azhar University alumni
Alumni of SOAS University of London
Alumni of the University of London
Fellows of Wolfson College, Cambridge
Islamic scholars in the United Kingdom
20th-century Muslim scholars of Islam
Muslim scholars of Islamic studies